Harry Pollitt (26 December 1865 – 23 January 1945) was an English railway engineer, who was Locomotive Engineer of the Manchester, Sheffield and Lincolnshire Railway from 1894 to 1897 and its successor, the Great Central Railway, from 1897 to 1900.

Biography
He was born on 26 December 1865 in Ashton-under-Lyne, Lancashire. His father was Sir William Pollitt, who became general manager of the Manchester, Sheffield and Lincolnshire Railway (MSLR) between 1866 and 1899.

Harry Pollitt was appointed Locomotive Engineer of the MSLR from January 1894, replacing Thomas Parker, who resigned at the end of 1893. Pollitt had previously been Works Manager at the Gorton locomotive works of the MSLR, under Parker. In June 1894, his duties were expanded to cover the MSLR's fleet of ferries on the Humber, and his job title was changed to Locomotive & Marine Engineer. On 1 August 1897, the MSLR was renamed the Great Central Railway (GCR).

Pollitt personally saw off the first GCR passenger service from Marylebone on 15 March 1899.

He resigned in June 1900, and married an Australian woman (Mabel Amanda Alves 1877-1944) the following year. He never worked again, his right to deploy the title Major (see his wife's will) in later life stems from his father's role in the 4th Battalion of The Manchester Regiment, a volunteer territorial regiment in which Harry never saw active service. He was succeeded as Locomotive and Marine Engineer by John G. Robinson.

Notes

References
 England & Wales, FreeBMD Birth Index, 1837-1915

London, England, Church of England Marriages and Banns, 1754-1938

External links
 LNER Encyclopedia

1865 births
People from Ashton-under-Lyne
English mechanical engineers
Locomotive builders and designers
English railway mechanical engineers
Great Central Railway people
1945 deaths